This is a list of notable alumni of the Graduate Institute of International and Development Studies (French: Institut de hautes études internationales et du développement, abbreviated IHEID or the Graduate Institute Geneva), a bilingual postgraduate university located in Geneva, Switzerland. Prominent alumni include three Nobel laureates, five heads of state, a Pulitzer Prize winner, one Secretary-General of the United Nations, and various senior figures at the UN and other international organisations, as well as many academics specialising in international economics, international history, international law, international relations, development studies, political science and anthropology.

Gallery

Nobel laureates 

Kofi Annan (DEA 1962), former secretary-general of the United Nations and 2001 Nobel Peace Prize winner
Mohamed ElBaradei (DEA 1964), Egyptian jurist and diplomat, former director general of the International Atomic Energy Agency, 1997–2009, and 2005 Nobel Peace Prize winner
Leonid Hurwicz (1940), Polish-American economist and mathematician, 2007 winner of the Nobel Memorial Prize in Economics

Law, politics and government

Heads of state and government 

Nazim al-Qudsi (1927), former President of Syria (1961-1963)
Micheline Calmy-Rey (Licence 1968), former president of the Swiss Confederation
Kurt Furgler (1948), former president of the Swiss Confederation and member of the Swiss Federal Council
Michel Kafando (1972), interim president of Burkina Faso, 2014–2015
Alpha Oumar Konaré, former president of Mali, 1992–2002; chairperson of the African Union Commission, 2003–2008
Henri, Grand Duke of Luxembourg (1980)
Boy Rozendal, Prime Minister of the Netherlands Antilles from 1971 to 1975

Cabinet ministers 

Delia Albert, former Secretary of Foreign Affairs of the Philippines
Lourdes Aranda Bezaury, Undersecretary of Foreign Affairs of Mexico
Youssouf Bakayoko (Certificate 1971), Foreign Minister of Côte d'Ivoire and ambassador
Davit Bakradze (1998), chairman of the Georgian Parliament and former Foreign Affairs Minister
Sibusiso Bengu (PhD 1974), former Minister of Education of South Africa; first black vice-chancellor of a South African university (Fort Hare University)
István Bibó (PhD 1935), former Minister of State of Hungary
Martin Coiteux (PhD), minister responsible for Government Administration of Quebec; chair of the Treasury Board of Quebec
Joseph Cuthbert, Minister of Education, Culture, External Affairs of Trinidad and Tobago, 1971–1986
Patricia Espinosa (DEA 1987), Secretary of Foreign Affairs of Mexico
Abul Fateh (Fellow 1962–1963), first Foreign Minister of Bangladesh
Kurt Furgler, Swiss politician and member of the Swiss Federal Council
Baba Gana Kingibe, former Nigerien minister
He Yafei (DEA 1987), Assistant Foreign Minister of China
Manouchehr Ganji (PhD 1960), Iranian human rights activist and former Education Minister
Bonaya Godana (PhD 1982), Foreign Minister of Kenya, 1998–2001
Parker T. Hart (Certificate 1936), former U.S. Assistant Secretary of State for Near Eastern and South Asian Affairs
Jafar Hassan (PhD 2000), Jordanian Minister of Planning and International Cooperation, 2009–2013
Annemarie Huber-Hotz (1975), Federal Chancellor of Switzerland, 2000–2007
Sandra Kalniete (1995), Minister of Foreign Affairs of Latvia, 2002–2004, current Member of the European Parliament
Patti Londono Jaramillo, Deputy Foreign Minister of Colombia, Vice-Minister of Multilateral Affairs, 2010–2013
Marie-Ange Lukiana Mufwankolo, Minister of Gender, Women and Children for the Democratic Republic of Congo.
Paul Martin Sr., Foreign Minister of Canada, 1963–1968
Omer Tshiunza Mbiye (DEA 1967), former Minister of Economy of the Democratic Republic of the Congo
Robert McFarlane (Licence), United States National Security Advisor, 1983–1985
Teodor Meleșcanu (PhD 1973), Minister of Foreign Affairs of Romania, former director of the Foreign Intelligence Service and former Minister of Defense
Ram Niwas Mirdha, former Cabinet Minister in India
Kamel Morjane(DEA 1976), former Defence Minister and Foreign Minister of Tunisia, 2005–2011
Saïd Ben Mustapha, Foreign Minister of Tunisia, 1997–1999
Kristiina Ojuland (1992), former Foreign Minister of Estonia and current member of the European Parliament
Andrzej Olechowski, former Minister of Finance and Minister of Foreign Affairs of Poland
Marco Piccinini, Minister of Finance and Economy of Monaco
Francisco Rivadeneira (1995), Minister of Foreign Trade and Economic Integration of Ecuador
Haroldo Rodas (DEA), Foreign Minister of Guatemala
Shri Shumsher K. Sheriff, secretary-general of the upper house of the Parliament of India
André Simonazzi (Licence 1992), vice-chancellor of the Swiss Federal Council
Albert Tévoédjrè, former Minister of Information of Benin
Tôn Thất Thiện (PhD 1963), former Cabinet Minister and public intellectual in Vietnam
Omar Touray (DEA 1992, PhD 1995), former Secretary of Foreign Affairs of the Gambia
Joseph Tsang Mang Kin, former Minister of Arts and Culture of Mauritius; poet
Gheorghe Vlădescu-Răcoasa, Romanian sociologist, journalist, left-wing politician and diplomat
James M. Wilson Jr., U.S. Assistant Secretary of State for Human Rights and Humanitarian Affairs from 1975 to 1977
Lt. Gen. (Rtd) Henry Tumukunde, former Minister of Security of Uganda

Judges 

Ann Aldrich, United States federal judge
Marc Bossuyt (PhD 1975), member of the Permanent Court of Arbitration
María Teresa Infante Caffi (PhD 1979), judge at the International Tribunal for the Law of the Sea
Mohamed Eltawila (Masters 2018), Judge at Egypt's Court of Cassation
Maurice Kamga (DEA 1997, PhD 2003), judge at the International Tribunal for the Law of the Sea
Pablo Sandonato de León (MA 2008, PhD 2013), judge at the Administrative Tribunal of the Organization of American States
Giorgio Malinverni (PhD 1974), judge at the European Court of Human Rights
Erik Møse, former president of the International Criminal Tribunal for Rwanda from 2003 to 2007
Fatsah Ouguergouz (PhD 1991), judge at the African Court on Human and Peoples' Rights
Christos Rozakis (visiting scholar 1985–1986), president of the Administrative Tribunal of the Council of Europe
Max Sørensen (PhD 1946), former judge at the European Court of Justice, 1973–1979, and the European Court of Human Rights, 1980–1981
Nina Vajić (DEA), judge at the European Court of Human Rights
Abdulqawi Yusuf (PhD 1980), ex-president of the International Court of Justice

Members of Parliament 

Rep. Michael D. Barnes (DEA 1966), US Congressman, 1979–1987
Eliyahu Ben-Elissar (PhD 1969), member of the Israeli Knesset and ambassador
Tarcísio Burity, former governor of Paraíba, Brazil
Jacques-Simon Eggly, Swiss Member of Parliament
Mauricio Mulder (DEA 1985), member of Peruvian Congress
Jacques Myard (PhD), member of the National Assembly of France
Hans-Gert Pöttering (PhD), former president of the European Parliament, 2007–2009
Meta Ramsay, Baroness Ramsay of Cartvale, former British intelligence officer and member of House of Lords
Emrys Roberts, president of the British Liberal Party, 1963–1964
Henri Schmitt, Swiss Member of Parliament and Member of the European Parliament
Alexandra Thein, German politician and Member of the European Parliament

Public officials 

Marco Aguiriano (Licence), Secretary of State for the European Union
Svein Andresen (PhD 1988), secretary-general of the Financial Stability Board
Shara L. Aranoff (Fulbright 1984–1985), chairman of the U.S. International Trade Commission
Tennent H. Bagley (PhD 1950), Deputy Chief of the CIA's Soviet Bloc Division during the 1960s; author
Frederic J. Brown III, U.S. Army lieutenant general
Iñigo Salvador Crespo (MIL 1994), state attorney general of Ecuador
Patricia Danzi (2001), Director General of the Swiss Agency for Development and Cooperation
Jack Fahy, US government official and suspected spy during World War II
Molly Gray (LLM 2016), Vermont’s 82nd lieutenant governor
Mary Dublin Keyserling, U.S. economist who faced loyalty allegations during the Red Scare
Signe Krogstrup (PhD 2003), Governor at the Central Bank of Denmark
Antonio Hodgers, Swiss politician
Annemarie Huber-Hotz, former Federal Chancellor of Switzerland
Carlos Lopes (DEA), High Representative of the Commission of the African Union, former UN under secretary-general and executive secretary of the Economic Commission for Africa
Andréa Maechler (DEA 1994), Swiss National Bank's first female board member; Deputy Division Chief in the International Monetary Fund's Monetary and Capital Markets Department
Jean-Pierre Roth (PhD 1975), former chairman of the Swiss National Bank
Yukari Sato, Japanese politician
Saki Scheck, member of the first parliament of the second republic of Ghana 
Robert-Jan Smits, director-general for research at the European Commission
William L. Stearman, American government official, aviator and author
James M. Wilson Jr., U.S. Assistant Secretary of State for Human Rights and Humanitarian Affairs
Marcelo Zabalaga (1977), ex-president of the Central Bank of Bolivia

Diplomacy 

Márcia Donner Abreu (DEA), ambassador of Brazil, Secretary for Bilateral Negotiations in Asia, the Pacific and Russia
Ochieng’ Adala, Ambassador of Kenya, executive director of the Africa Peace Forum
John A. Baker Jr., U.S. diplomat
Félix Baumann (DEA 1995), ambassador of Switzerland to the United Nations in Geneva
William M. Bellamy (Certificate), Ret. US ambassador
Térence Billeter (DEA), ambassador of Switzerland to China
Jean-Marc Boulgaris (1970), former Swiss ambassador to Colombia and Denmark
Nadia Burger (1996), ambassador of Canada to Indonesia & Timor-Leste
Linus von Castelmur (1992), ambassador of Switzerland to India
Arlette Conzemius (DEA), Swiss permanent representative to NATO
Jean-Jacques de Dardel (DEA, PhD 1980), Swiss ambassador to China
Shelby Cullom Davis (PhD 1934), US ambassador to Switzerland, 1969–1975; philanthropist
Elyes Ghariani, Tunisian ambassador to Germany
Rubén González Sosa (DEA), ambassador, under-secretary of foreign affairs, 1971–1976, and acting foreign minister of Mexico, 1970–1975
Edvard Hambro, Norwegian legal scholar, diplomat and politician
Erwin Hofer (1976), Swiss ambassador to Russia
Claude Heller (DEA), ambassador of Mexico to the United Nations
Tamara Kunanayakam (DEA 1982), ambassador of Sri Lanka to the United Nations Office in Geneva; chairperson-rapporteur of the United Nations Open-ended Intergovernmental Working Group on the Right to Development, Human Rights Council
Egriselda López (MA 2018), Permanent representative of El Salvador to the United Nations in New York
A.H.M. Moniruzzaman (certificate '89), ambassador of Bangladesh to Belgium, Switzerland, and Luxembourg
Walid Abdel Nasser, ambassador of Egypt to the United Nations Office in Geneva
Robert G. Neumann (1937), American ambassador and politician
François Nordmann (DEA 1972), Swiss ambassador to France
Cyrille S. Oguin, Benin ambassador to the United States
Assad Omer, ambassador of Afghanistan to France
Christophe Parisot (1999), ambassador of France to Denmark
Jean-François Paroz, Swiss diplomat
Marcial Perez Chiriboga (PhD 1965), former ambassador of Venezuela to the US
Michael Reiterer (1985), ambassador of the European Commission to Switzerland
Oswaldo de Rivero, permanent representative of Peru to the United Nations in New York
Patricia Elaine Joan Rodgers, Bahamian diplomat
Jean-Daniel Ruch, ambassador of Switzerland to Israel
Mohamed Shaker (PhD 1976), Egyptian ambassador
Alvaro de Soto (es) (DEA 1980), ambassador of Peru to France
Zalman Shoval (DEA 1952), former Israeli ambassador to the US
Luis Solari Tudela, ambassador of Peru to the United Kingdom
Mohamed Ibrahim Shaker (PhD 1975), Egyptian ambassador
Jeno Stahelin, first Swiss Permanent Representative to the United Nations in New York
Tuomas Tapio (PhD 2003), Ambassador of Finland to the OECD
Nikolaos Vamvounakis (DEA 1975), Greek ambassador in Bangkok and non-resident ambassador to Singapore, Cambodia, Laos and Myanmar
Christian Wenaweser, ambassador of Liechtenstein to the United Nations
Rodrigo Alberto Carazo Zeledón (PhD 1997), ambassador of Costa Rica to the United Nations

United Nations and international organisations 

Arnauld Antoine Akodjènou (PhD '88), head of the United Nations Multidimensional Integrated Stabilization Mission in Mali (MINUSMA)
Catarina de Albuquerque, UN Special Rapporteur on the human right to safe drinking water and sanitation
Hédi Annabi, former Special Representative of the United Nations Secretary-General for Haiti
Anthony Banbury  (DEA 1993), United Nations Assistant Secretary-General for Field Support, Deputy Ebola Coordinator and Operation Crisis Manager
Marcel André Boisard (PhD), Under-Secretary General to the United Nations and former executive director of United Nations Institute for Training and Research
Cornelio Sommaruga, former president of the ICRC
Arthur E. Dewey, former Assistant UN Secretary-General
Arthur Dunkel, director-general of General Agreement on Tariffs and Trade (GATT), 1980–1993
Ernesto Hernandez-Cata Associate Director of the International Monetary Fund (IMF), 1971-2002. Founding Member, former President, and former Treasurer of the Association for the Study of the Cuban Economy (ASCE)
Kamil Idris (PhD 1964), director-general of the World Intellectual Property Organization (WIPO), 1997–2008
Kaarina Immonen, U.N. official
C. Wilfred Jenks, director-general of the International Labour Organization, 1970–1973
Jakob Kellenberger (1974–1975), president of the ICRC, 2000–2012
Pierre Krähenbühl, Commissioner-General of the United Nations Relief and Works Agency for Palestine Refugees in the Near East (UNRWA)
Bengt Liljestrand, commander of the United Nations Truce Supervision Organization (UNTSO) and the Second United Nations Emergency Force.
Olivier Long (PhD 1943), director-general of the General Agreement on Tariffs and Trade, 1968–1980
Carlos Lopes (DEA), UN under secretary-general and executive secretary of the Economic Commission for Africa
Jonathan Lucas (PhD 1998), head of the International Narcotics Control Board
Jacques Moreillon (PhD 1971), former director-general of the ICRC
Martha Ama Akyaa Pobee, Assistant Secretary-General of the United Nations for Africa at the United Nations Secretariat
Arnold Rørholt (jurist), Norwegian jurist and refugee worker.
Eric Suy, UN under secretary-general for legal affairs and director-general of the European Office of the United Nations in Geneva
Mervat Tallawy, Egyptian politician, former UN under-secretary and executive secretary of ESCWA
Laura Thompson Chacón (DEA), deputy director-general of the International Organization for Migration and Costa Rican Ambassador
Sérgio Vieira de Mello, former United Nations High Commissioner for Human Rights
Clément Nyaletsossi Voule, Togolese jurist
René-Jean Wilhelm (PhD 1983), co-author of the Geneva Conventions
Ralph Zacklin, UN Assistant Secretary-General for Legal Affairs

Nobility 

Duarte Pio, Duke of Braganza and pretender to the throne of Portugal
Princess Nora of Liechtenstein
Maria Teresa, Grand Duchess of Luxembourg (1989)

Business 

Paul Appermont, Belgian businessman
Sasha Bezuhanova, Bulgarian businesswoman
Larry Carp, attorney-at-law
Ralph D. Crosby Jr. (DEA 1976), chairman and CEO of Airbus Group, Inc. (formerly EADS North America), 2002–2009
Vitalii Demianiuk, Ukrainian engineer, entrepreneur, public figure and philanthropist.
Jean-Marc Duvoisin (DEA 1985), CEO of Nespresso
Nobuyuki Idei, founder and CEO of Quantum Leaps Corporation; chairman and Group CEO of Sony Corporation, 1999–2005
Daniel Jaeggi, co-founder of Mercuria Energy Group
Rick Gilmore (PhD 1971), president and CEO of the GIC Group and Council on Foreign Relations scholar
Philipp Hildebrand (DEA 1990), vice-president of BlackRock, former president of the Swiss National Bank
Léon Lambert, Belgian banker and art collector
Lynn Forester de Rothschild (Fellow 1978–1979), CEO of E.L. Rothschild
Yan Lan (PhD 1993), managing director of Lazard China
Vera Michalski, Swiss publisher
Frank Melloul (Licence 1999), CEO of i24news
Jennifer Motles, chief sustainability officer of Philip Morris International
Christopher Murphy-Ives (DES 1990), vice-president and deputy general counsel for Europe, Middle East and Africa, Latin America and Canada at Hewlett-Packard
Naneen Neubohn, former financial executive at Morgan Stanley
Jean-François de Saussure, CEO of Caran d'Ache
Tadzio Schilling (MA), chief executive officer of the Association of European Businesses 
Brad Smith (DEA 1984), president and chief legal officer, Microsoft
Rafael Tiago Juk Benke, Global Head of Corporate Affairs of Brazilian multinational Vale
G. Richard Thoman, American businessman and former president and CEO of Xerox Corporation
Bernard Zen-Ruffinen, president of Europe, Middle East and Africa at Korn Ferry International
Carl Zimmerer, founder and CEO of InterFinanz

Public policy 

Allison Anderson (DEA), former director of the Inter-Agency Network for Education in Emergencies
Antony Alcock (PhD 1968), Ulster Unionist politician
Jennifer Blanke (PhD 2005), chief economist, World Economic Forum
Puruesh Chaudhary (MA), futures researcher
Julius E. Coles, former president of Africare
Robert M. Cutler (Gallatin Fellow 1979-1980), senior research fellow and director of the NATO Association of Canada Energy Security Program
Laurent Goetschel (1993), director of swisspeace
Stephanie T. Kleine-Ahlbrandt (DEA), Asia-Pacific director at United States Institute of Peace and Council on Foreign Relations scholar
Edward Kossoy (PhD 1975), Polish lawyer and activist for victims of Nazism
Berhane Ras-Work, Ethiopian anti-FGM activist
Gerhart M. Riegner, secretary-general of the World Jewish Congress, 1965–1983; in 1942, he sent the so-called Riegner Telegram
Riadh Sidaoui, Tunisian political scientist and director of Geneva's Centre Arabe de Recherches et d'Analyses Politiques et Sociales
Hernando de Soto, Peruvian economist and president of the Institute for Liberty and Democracy
Matthias Stiefel, founder of Interpeace
Fred Tanner (Licence), ambassador and former director of the Geneva Centre for Security Policy
John Ulanga (DPP 2013), executive director of the Foundation for Civil Society, Tanzania
Tek Vannara (DPP 2007), executive director of the NGO Forum on Cambodia
Scott Vaughan (IEP 2014), president and chief executive officer of the International Institute for Sustainable Development
Willem de Vogel (Licence), chairman of The Jamestown Foundation
René Wadlow, president and representative to the UN of the Association of World Citizens
Laure Waridel , Canadian social activist, writer and executive director of the Centre interdisciplinaire de recherche en opérationnalisation du développement durable (CIRODD)
Leicester Chisholm Webb, Australian political scientist, public servant and journalist
Béatrice Wertli (Licence), secretary-general of the Christian Democratic People's Party of Switzerland
Kanitha Wichiencharoen, Thai lawyer and women's rights advocate
Theodor H. Winkler (Licence 1977, PhD 1981), director of the Geneva Centre for the Democratic Control of Armed Forces
Samuel A. Worthington (Fulbright 1985), CEO of InterAction
Thierry Zomahoun, chairman and CEO of the Niagara Forum

Academia

Economics 

Victoria Curzon-Price (PhD), economist and former director of the Mont Pelerin Society
Paul Demeny (1957), economist who pioneered the concept of Demeny voting
Paul Dembinski, scholar specialized on finance and ethics
Rüdiger Dornbusch (Licence 1966), international economics scholar at MIT
Marcus Fleming, Scottish economist, former deputy director of the research department of the International Monetary Fund
Rikard Forslid (PhD 1994), professor of economics at Stockholm University
Asher Hobson (PhD 1931), agricultural economist
Harry Gideonse (1928), economist, second president of Brooklyn College and Chancellor of the New School for Social Research
Urban Jermann (PhD 1994), professor of international finance at the Wharton School, University of Pennsylvania
Lewis Webster Jones, president of the University of Arkansas, 1947–1951; president of Rutgers University, 1951–1958
Karl William Kapp (PhD 1936), founding father of ecological economics and a leading institutional economist
Patrick Low – Chief Economist at the World Trade Organization.
Gianmarco Ottaviano (Diploma 1994), professor of economics at the London School of Economics and Political Science

History 

Philippe Burrin, historian specialized in the history of facism and of the Shoah
Ernst Engelberg, German university professor and Marxist historian
Saul Friedländer (PhD 1963), Israeli historian of Germany and Jewish history at UCLA, winner of the 2008 Pulitzer Prize for General Non-Fiction
Piero Gleijeses (PhD 1972), Italian historian of U.S. foreign relations at the Johns Hopkins University School of Advanced International Studies (SAIS), best known for his scholarly studies of Cuban foreign policy under Fidel Castro
Robert A. Graham (PhD 1952), Jesuit, church historian and authority on papal diplomacy
Peter Hruby (PhD 1978), historian of central and eastern Europe
William Lazonick (PhD 1975), business historian, winner of the 2010 Schumpeter Prize
John Joseph Mathews, historian who became one of the Osage Nation's most important spokespeople and writers
Arno J. Mayer, Luxembourg-born American Marxist historian, Dayton-Stockton Professor Emeritus of History at Princeton University
Gerhard Menk (1969), German historian and honorary professor at the University of Giessen
Boris Mouravieff (PhD 1951), Russian historian
André Reszler (Licence 1958, PhD 1966), scholar of the history of ideas
Ivan L. Rudnytsky (PhD 1951), noted historian of Ukrainian socio-political thought

International law 

Georges Abi-Saab (PhD), Egyptian international law specialist
Jean Allain (PhD 2000), professor of international law and associate dean, Monash University's faculty of law
Michael Bothe (diploma 1966), professor of public law, Johann Wolfgang Goethe-Universität Frankfurt, and chair of the Commission for International Humanitarian Law
Bartram S. Brown (PhD 1989), professor of international law, member of the Council on Foreign Relations and member of the board of directors of Amnesty International, USA
Laurence Boisson de Chazournes (PhD 1991), professor of international law at the University of Geneva
Lucius Caflisch – Swiss international law specialist, member of the United Nations International Law Commission
Cleopatra Doumbia-Henry, president of the World Maritime University
Willem Thomas Eijsbouts (DEA 1971), professor of European law at Leiden University
Ossip K. Flechtheim, German jurist credited with coining the term "Futurology"
Marcelo Kohen (PhD 1995), Professor of International Law at the Graduate Institute of International and Development Studies, Secretary-General of the Institut de Droit International
Kalliopi Koufa, Emeritus Professor of Law at the Aristotle University of Thessaloniki, former UN Special Rapporteur on Terrorism and Human Rights
Robert Kolb (PhD 1998), professor of international law at the University of Geneva
Virginia Leary (PhD 1982), one of first women to attend the University of Chicago Law School, professor of law at the State University of New York at Buffalo
Krystyna Marek, Swiss-Polish professor of international law
Frédéric Mégret (PhD 2006), professor of international law at McGill University, Canada Research Chair in the Law of Human Rights and Legal Pluralism
Steven Ratner (DEA), professor of international law at the University of Michigan's International Institute
Cesare P.R. Romano (PhD 1999), international law professor at Loyola Law School Los Angeles
Lyal S. Sunga (PhD 1991), ex-OHCHR official; Visiting Professor, Raoul Wallenberg Institute of Human Rights and Humanitarian Law; Special Advisor on Human Rights and Humanitarian Law, International Development Law Organization; head, Rule of Law program, The Hague Institute for Global Justice; human rights, humanitarian law, and international criminal law expert
Jiří Toman (PhD 1981), expert in the field of international law, professor at Santa Clara University School of Law
Jorge E. Viñuales (Licence and DEA), Harold Samuel Professor of Law and Environmental Policy at the University of Cambridge

International relations and political science 

Mahdi Ahouie (PhD 2008), international relations professor at the University of Tehran
Jonathan Luke Austin (PhD 2017), British political sociologist at University of Copenhagen
Pontus Braunerhjelm (PhD 1994), professor of economics at the Royal Institute of Technology
Lars-Erik Cederman (MA 90), Swiss-Swedish political scientist and professor of International Conflict Research at ETH Zurich
Andrew W. Cordier (1930–1931), former president of Columbia University, 1968–1970
Wolfgang F. Danspeckgruber (PhD 1994), Austrian political scientist at Princeton University, expert on self-determination
Marwa Daoudy (PhD), associate professor of international relations specializing in the Middle East at Georgetown University
André Donneur (PhD 1967), Canadian political scientist
Manfred Elsig, professor of International Relations at the World Trade Institute of the University of Bern
Osita C. Eze (PhD 1975), former director-general of the Nigerian Institute of International Affairs
Sieglinde Gstöhl (PhD 1988), director of studies at the College of Europe in Bruges
Marcelo Gullo (MA), Argentinian international relations professor
Jeffrey Harrod, professor of political economy
Thierry Hentsch (PhD 1967), Swiss-Canadian political philosopher
John H. Herz (Diploma 1938), American scholar of international relations and law
Shireen Hunter (PhD 1983), research professor at Georgetown University, member of the Council on Foreign Relations and scholar on Iran
Dimitri Kitsikis (1962), Greek Turkologist
Bahgat Korany (PhD 1974), Fellow of the Royal Society of Canada and professor at the American University in Cairo; winner of the International Studies Association's 2015 Distinguished Scholar Award
Albert Legault, Canadian political scientist
Urs Luterbacher (PhD 1974), political scientist specializing in game theory
Zidane Meriboute (PhD 1983), SOAS scholar specializing in Islam
Kristen Monroe (junior year), American political scientist specializing in political psychology and ethics
Hans Joachim Morgenthau (post-graduate work 1932), leading political scientist of international relations
Gordon Mace, professor of political science at Université Laval
Carla Norrlöf, Swedish-Ethiopian political scientist
Philippe Regnier (PhD 1986), professor at the School of International Development and Global Studies, University of Ottawa
Gilbert Rist, professor and critic of international development
Philippe C. Schmitter (Licence 1961), emeritus professor of the Department of Political and Social Sciences at the European University Institute
Pierre de Senarclens (PhD 1973), international relations theorist
Hsueh Shou Sheng (Licence, PhD 1953), vice-chancellor of Nanyang University in Singapore, 1972–1975 and founding rector of the University of Macau
Peter Uvin (PhD 1991), provost of Amherst College and former Henry J. Leir Professor of International Humanitarian Studies at the Fletcher School of Law and Diplomacy at Tufts University
Edmundo Hernández-Vela (PhD), emeritus professor of international relations, National Autonomous University of Mexico
Jessica L.P. Weeks (MA 2003), professor of political science at the University of Wisconsin–Madison
Zhang Weiwei (professor) (1994), professor of international relations at Fudan University
Thomas G. Weiss, presidential professor at the Graduate Center of the City University of New York, international relations scholar recognized as an authority on the United Nations system
Francis O. Wilcox, former dean of the Johns Hopkins University School of Advanced International Studies

Linguistics 

George W. Grace (Licence 1948), linguist specializing in Oceanic languages of Melanesia

Public health 

Maria Carolina Loureiro, professor of global health at Pontifical Catholic University of São Paulo
Heather Lynn Wipfli, associate professor of clinical preventive medicine and international relations at the University of Southern California

Broadcasting, journalism and literature 

Frédéric Bastien (PhD), Canadian author and historian
Robert Albert Bauer (1931), anti-Nazi radio broadcaster with Voice of America
James Becket, documentary filmmaker
René Cruse, French public intellectual, writer
Carlos Fuentes (1950), Mexican novelist, essayist and former diplomat
Eric Hoesli, Swiss journalist
Michel Jeanneret (Licence), editor-in-chief of L'Illustré
Elizabeth Jensen (DES '83), ombudsman and public editor of NPR
Beat Kappeler (PhD 1970), Swiss journalist
Helen Kirkpatrick (DEA), American war correspondent during the Second World War
Esther Mamarbachi (DEA 1992), Swiss broadcast journalist
Selim Matar, Iraqi novelist and sociologist
Derek B. Miller (PhD 2004), American novelist
Malika Nedir (Diploma), Swiss news anchor
Cholpon Orozobekova, prominent Kyrgyz journalist
Jean-Pierre Péroncel-Hugoz (PhD 1974), French journalist and essayist
Nicolas Rossier (1995), American filmmaker and reporter
Pierre Ruetschi (Licence '83), Swiss journalist
Arnold Sagalyn, American journalist
Jon Woronoff (Licence 1965), American writer and East Asian specialist
Madeleine Zabriskie Doty (PhD 1945), American journalist and pacifist

Other 

Muqbil Al-Zahawi, Iraqi ceramist
Kathryn Wasserman Davis, American philanthropist
Imran N. Hosein, Islamic scholar
Jacques Piccard, deep-sea explorer and inventor
Bastiaan Quast, Dutch-Swiss data scientist
Kazem Rajavi (PhD 1975), Iranian human rights advocate and professor believed to have been assassinated by the Iranian government

References

External links 
Alumni page

 01